Stephen John McGhie  is an Australian politician. He has been a Labor Party member of the Victorian Legislative Assembly since November 2018, representing the seat of Melton. In December 2020, McGhie was sworn in as the Parliamentary Secretary for Health in the Andrews' Government.

McGhie was formerly the state secretary of Ambulance Employees Australia – Victoria.

References

Year of birth missing (living people)
Living people
Australian Labor Party members of the Parliament of Victoria
Members of the Victorian Legislative Assembly
Australian trade unionists
21st-century Australian politicians
Labor Left politicians